Davies House may refer to:

Davies House (Berks County, Pennsylvania)
Betts House (Yale University), a Yale University building in New Haven, Connecticut formerly known as the Davies House
George S. Clement House, Wauseon, Ohio, USA, also known as Davies House
Edward Davies House, Churchtown, Pennsylvania
Charles E. Davies House, Provo, Utah
Dr. James Davies House, Boise, Idaho, listed on the National Register of Historic Places (NRHP) in Ada County
A house in Bayside

See also 
Davies Manor, Memphis, Tennessee
William Davie House (disambiguation)
Davies' Chuck Wagon Diner, Lakewood, Colorado, listed on the National Register of Historic Places (NRHP) in Jefferson County
Davies Hotel, Lamar, Colorado, NRHP-listed in Prowers County
Davies Building, Topeka, Kansas, NRHP-listed in Shawnee County